The Arizona and Swansea Railroad (A&S RR) was a mining railroad that operated from a connection with the Arizona and California Railway (later the Santa Fe Railway) at Bouse to a copper and gold mine at Swansea, Arizona, .  The A&S RR was owned and operated by the Swansea Consolidated Gold & Copper Company.

History

The A&S RR was constructed in 1909 to build to the Clara Consolidated Mining Company at Swansea.  Track construction commenced in November 1909 and the line was completed by December 31, 1909.  In 1937 the A&S RR was abandoned.

Motive Power
Engine #1 was purchased used from the El Paso and Southwestern Railroad (#179) and was a 2-8-0 (Consolidation Type) locomotive built (Builder # 3852) by Baldwin Locomotive Works in 1876.
Engine #3 was a 2-8-0 (Consolidation Type) locomotive that was purchased new (Builder #48024) in 1910 from the Schenectady Locomotive Works.

Route
0.0 Bouse (Junction with Arizona and California Railway) - later the Santa Fe Railway
Today, a Bureau of Land Management plaque marks the site.
16.0 Summit
18.5 Clara
21.1 Swansea

See also
List of defunct Arizona railroads

References

Defunct Arizona railroads
1909 in Arizona Territory